Tralee is an unincorporated community in Wyoming County, West Virginia, United States, along Barkers Creek and West Virginia Route 10.

The community's name may be a transfer from Tralee, Ireland.

References

Unincorporated communities in West Virginia
Unincorporated communities in Wyoming County, West Virginia
Coal towns in West Virginia